Rashan is a given name.  Notable people with the name include:

Rashan Charles (1996/1997 – 2017), British man who died during a police arrest
Rashan Gary (born 1997), American football player
Rashan Peiris (born 1982), Sri Lankan cricketer

See also
Rashaan, given name
Rashaun, given name
Rashawn, given name
Rashon, given name

Sinhalese masculine given names